The 1961–62 season was Manchester United's 60th season in the Football League, and their 17th consecutive season in the top division of English football. Unlike the previous season, United declined to enter the Football League Cup, which they continue to decline for the next four seasons.

New to the side for the 1961–62 season was David Herd, who had been the First Division's second highest goalscorer the previous season. He joined the United ranks for a fee of £40,000, and finished the season as the club's top scorer with 14 goals in the league and 17 in all competitions, although it was a disappointing season for the club as they finished 15th in the First Division.

First Division

FA Cup

Squad statistics

References

Manchester United F.C. seasons
Manchester United